Jason Massie (born 13 September 1984) is a former English footballer.

Career

College and amateur
Massie was a member of the schoolboy academy at storied English football club Liverpool, working his way from the U12 team to play a few times with the club's reserves.

After a short stint with English non-league side Prescot Cables in the Northern Premier League, Massie moved to the United States to attend and play college soccer at the University of Rio Grande. He earned NAIA All-Region honors in 2007 and All-Conference accolades in 2007 and 2008, and was also an Honorable Mention All-American both years.

During his college years Massie also played in the USL Premier Development League with the Cape Cod Crusaders.

Professional
Massie turned professional in 2009 when he signed with the Harrisburg City Islanders in the USL Second Division. He made his professional debut on 18 April 2009 in Harrisburg's opening day 2–2 tie with the Richmond Kickers, and went on to make 13 appearances for the team before being released at the end of the season.

Having been unable to secure a professional contract elsewhere, Massie signed to play with USL Premier Development League expansion franchise GPS Portland Phoenix in 2010; the Phoenix are owned by the same parent company that ran the Cape Cod Crusaders.

After a brief stint back in England playing Northern Premier League side Marine, Massie returned to play for GPS Portland Phoenix in 2011. On 19 February 2013 he signed with Kingston FC of the Canadian Soccer League. During his tenure with Kingston he helped the club clinch the regular season championship. In the playoffs the club reached the CSL Championship finals where they faced SC Waterloo, but were defeated by a score of 3–1. On 1 May 2015 he signed with Cataraqui Clippers of League1 Ontario.

International
Massie played for the England U17s team, but has never played for any of his country's senior teams.

References

External links
Harrisburg City Islanders bio

1984 births
Living people
English footballers
Liverpool F.C. players
Prescot Cables F.C. players
Penn FC players
Cape Cod Crusaders players
GPS Portland Phoenix players
Marine F.C. players
USL Second Division players
USL League Two players
Expatriate soccer players in the United States
Kingston FC players
Canadian Soccer League (1998–present) players
Association football midfielders
English expatriate sportspeople in the United States
English expatriate footballers
English expatriate sportspeople in Canada
Expatriate soccer players in Canada
Kingston Clippers players